The 2006 Mojo Honours List.

Nominees
Complete list of nominees (winners in bold):

Best New Act - presented to an act who have made a significant impact over the last 18 months 
Corinne Bailey Rae 
Guillemots 
Amadou & Mariam
Teddy Thompson 
Archie Bronson Outfit
The Raconteurs
Inspiration Award - presented to an act that has been the catalyst for music fans and fellow musicians alike
Sparks
Johnny Cash
Buzzcocks
Paul Weller
The Fall
Mojo Icon - the recipient of this award has enjoyed a spectacular career on a global scale 
David Bowie
Scott Walker
Johnny Cash
Neil Young
Van Morrison
Catalogue Release of the Year - presented to the reissue that is both definitive and beautifully packaged
Johnny Cash - Legend 
Talking Heads - Reissue Series 
Orange Juice - The Glasgow School 
Various - Anthems in Eden
Various - Strangely Strange But Oddly Normal
Jeff Wayne - War of the Worlds
Vision Award - presented to the best music DVD package of the year in recognition of visual innovation and impact
Kraftwerk - Minimum-Maximum
Bob Dylan - No Direction Home
Ramones - The Story of the Ramones
DiG!
Flaming Lips - Fearless Freaks
The Mayor of Sunset Strip
Songwriter Award - presented to an artist whose career has been defined by their ability to consistently pen classic material
Joe Strummer
Richard Hawley
Kate Bush
Chrissie Hynde
Nick Cave
Classic Album - presented by Mojo to an artist responsible for a landmark release in the history of rock
Tago Mago by Can
Roots Award
Dan Penn & Spooner Oldham
Hero Award
Prince Buster
Lifetime Achievement Award
David Gilmour
Merit Award
Bert Jansch
Hall of Fame - presented by Mojo to an act or solo star who is best described as "an artists' artist"
Elton John
Les Paul Award - presented to a visionary performer on the guitar
Brian May
Mojo Medal
Jools Holland
Maverick Award
The Jesus & Mary Chain

References

External links
Mojo magazine

Mojo
British music awards
Mojo Awards
Mojo Awards
Mojo